The Many Moods of Tony is an album by Tony Bennett, released in 1964. The album reached a peak position of number 20 on the Billboard 200.

Track listing
 "The Little Boy" (Al Stillman, Guy Wood) – 2:22
 "When Joanna Loved Me" (Jack Segal, Robert Wells) – 3:05
 "A Taste of Honey" (Bobby Scott, Ric Marlow) – 2:51
 "Soon It's Gonna Rain" (Harvey Schmidt, Tom Jones) – 3:40
 "The Kid's A Dreamer (The Kid From Fool's Paradise)" featuring Bobby Hacket on cornet (Douglas Arthur, Herb Hendler) – 2:34
 "So Long, Big Time!" (Harold Arlen, Dory Langdon) – 3:51
 "Don't Wait Too Long" (Sunny Skylar) – 2:36
 "Caravan" featuring Chico Hamilton on drums and arranged and conducted by Ralph Sharon (Duke Ellington, Irving Mills, and Juan Tizol)  – 2:42
 "Spring In Manhattan" featuring the Will Bronson Singers (Alice Reach, Anthony Scibetta) – 2:32
 "I'll Be Around" featuring Bobby Hackett on cornet (Alec Wilder) – 3:05
 "You've Changed" featuring The Noteworthies and arranged and conducted by Ralph Sharon (Bill Carey, Carl T. Fischer) – 3:16
 "Limehouse Blues" featuring Dick Hyman on organ (Douglas Furber, Philip Braham) – 3:21

References

1964 albums
Columbia Records albums
Tony Bennett albums